The Balkan endemic plants includes a number of unique taxa and (species, subspecies, variety and forms) that are widespread in a variety of sizes area and,
including stenoendemics.

The following list of endemic plants on the Balkans includes all known taxa in this category, from Greek (including  Pindus mountain system), Albania, Kosovo, North Macedonia, Serbia, Bosnia and Herzegovina, Montenegro, Croatia and Slovenia. The Northeast limit of this area is the Sava river valley.  the border continues along the Danube, including most of Bulgaria, and southeast to the European part of Turkey. It includes  Pannonian zone of the Balkans up to southern Romania.

Observed endemics are classified in 163 genera and 52 families.

Endemic taxa

A
Abies borisii-regis, Pinaceae
Abies cephalonica, Pinaceae
Abies omorika, Pinaceae
Acanthus balcanicus, Acanthaceae
Acer heldreichii, AceraceaeAchillea ageratifolia, AsteraceaeAchillea clypeolata, AsteraceaeAchillea depressa, AsteraceaeAchillea pannonica, AsteraceaeAcinos majoranifolius, LamiaceaeAcinos orontius, Lamiaceae (Labiateae) 
Alchemilla jumrukczalica, Rosaceae
Alchemilla vranicensis, Rosaceae
Alkanna pulmonaria ssp. noneiformis, Boraginaceae
Allium melanantherum, Amaryllidaceae
Alyssum doerfleri, Brassicaceae
Alyssum mellendorffianum, Brassicaceae
Amphoricarpus bertisceus, Asteraceae
Amphoricarpus neumayeri, Asteraceae
Anemone transsilvanica, RanunculaceaeAnthemis carpatica, AsteraceaeAnthemis jordanovii,  AsteraceaeAquilegia amaliae var. dinarica, RanunculaceaeAquilegia chrysantha var. aurea, RanunculaceaeAquilegia dinarica, RanunculaceaeAquilegia grata, RanunculaceaeAquilegia nigricans ssp. subscaposa, Ranunculaceae
Arabis ferdinandi-coburgii, Brassicaceae
Arenaria rhodopaea, Caryophyllaceae
Arnebia densiflora, BoraginaceaeAsperula hercegovina, RubiaceaeAster tripolium ssp. pannonicus, AsteraceaeAstragalus alopecurus, FabaceaeAstragalus exscapus, FabaceaeAstragalus peterfii, FabaceaeAstragalus physocalyx, FabaceaeAstragalus pseudopurpureus, Fabaceae
Astragalus roemeri, Fabaceae
Athamanta macedonica, Apiaceae
Athamanta turbith ssp hungarica, Apiaceae
Avenochloa decora, Poaceae

B
Barbarea bosniaca, Brassicaceae
Barbarea vulgaris, Brassicaceae
Brassica nivalis ssp. jordanoffii, Brassicaceae
Bromopsis moesiaca, Poaceae
Bruckenthalia spiculifolia, Ericaceae
Bupleurum aristatum var. karglii, Apiaceae

CCampanopsis dalmatica, CampanulaceaeCampanula albanica, CampanulaceaeCampanula cespitosa,Campanula elatines var. fenestrellata, CampanulaceaeCampanula graminifolia var. linearifolia, CampanulaceaeCampanula hercegovina, CampanulaceaeCampanula jacquinii ssp. rumeliana, CampanulaceaeCampanula linifolia ssp. justiniana, CampanulaceaeCampanula oreadum, CampanulaceaeCampanula romanica, Campanulaceae
Campanula scutellata, Campanulaceae
Campanula tommasiniana, Campanulaceae
Campanula velebitica, Campanulaceae
Campanula waldsteiniana, Campanulaceae
Cardamine maritima, Brassicaceae
Carduus collinus, AsteraceaeCarduus kerneri ssp. lobulatiformis, AsteraceaeCarduus rhodopaeus, Asteraceae Carum velenovskyi, ApiaceaeCentaurea achtarovii, Asteraceae Centaurea biokovensis, AsteraceaeCentaurea derventana, Asteraceae (Compositae) Centaurea jankae, AsteraceaeCentaurea kernerana, AsteraceaeCentaurea macedonica, AsteraceaeCentaurea mannagettae, Asteraceae
Centaurea parilica, AsteraceaeCentaurea phrygia ssp. rarauensis,Centaurea phrygia ssp. ratezatensis, AsteraceaeCentaurea pinnatifida, AsteraceaeCentaurea pontica, AsteraceaeCentaurea trichocephala, AsteraceaeCephalaria radiata, CaprifoliaceaeCerastium banaticum, CaryophyllaceaeCerastium decalvans, Caryophyllaceae
Cerastium fontanum ssp. grandiflorum, Caryophyllaceae
Cerastium transsylvanicum, Caryophyllaceae
Chamaecytisus tommasinii, Fabaceae
Chamaedrys ecytisus tommasinii, Fabaceae (Papilionaceae)
Chamaedrys montana, Lamiaceae
Chondrilla urumovii, Asteraceae
Cicerbita pancicii,  Asteraceae
Cirsium appendiculatum,  Asteraceae
Cirsium brachycephalum, Asteraceae
Clinopodium frivaldszkyanum, Lamiaceae
Colchicum bulbocodioides ssp. hungaricum, Colchicaceae
Colchicum callicymbium, Colchicaceae
Colchicum hungaricum var. doerfleri, Colchicaceae
Corothamnus agnipilus, Fabaceae
Corothamnus rectipilosus, Fabaceae
Crepis dinarica, Compositae (Asteraceae)
Crepis macedonia, Asteraceae
Crepis pantocseki, Asteraceae (Cichoriaceae)
Crepis praemorsa ssp. dinarica, Asteraceae
Crepis schachtii, Asteraceae
Crocus cvijicii, Iridaceae
Crocus lageniflorus var. oliverianus, Iridaceae
Crocus scardicus, Iridaceae
Cyanus napuliferus, Asteraceae
Cynoglossum hungaricum, Boraginaceae

D
Daphne malyana, Thymelaeaceae
Daphne pontica, ThymelaeaceaeDegenia velebitica, Brassicaceae
Delphinium simonkaianum, Ranunculaceae
Dianthus bertisceus, CaryophyllaceaeDianthus callizonus, CaryophyllaceaeDianthus carthusianorum ssp. tenuifolius, CaryophyllaceaeDianthus freyni, CaryophyllaceaeDianthus glacilis ssp. gelidus, CaryophyllaceaeDianthus henteri, CaryophyllaceaeDianthus knapii, CaryophyllaceaeDianthus petraeus, CaryophyllaceaeDianthus spiculifolius, Caryophyllaceae
Dioscorea balcanica, Dioscoreaceae
Draba dorneri, Brassicaceae
Draba haynaldii, Brassicaceae
Draba simonkaiana, Brassicaceae

EEchinops bannaticus, AsteraceaeEdraianthus glisicii, CampanulaceaeEdraianthus graminifolius ssp. niveus, CampanulaceaeEdraianthus niveus, CampanulaceaeEdraianthus serpyllifolius ssp. dinaricus, CampanulaceaeEdraianthus sutjeskae, CampanulaceaeEphedra major, EphedraceaeEranthus hyemalis var. bulgaricus, RanunculaceaeEryngium palmatum, ApiaceaeEryngium serbicum, ApiaceaeEulsatilla rhodopaea, RanunculaceaeEuphorbia gregersenii, EuphorbiaceaeEuphorbion myrsinitum, Euphorbiaceae

FFestuca bucegiensis, Poaceae
Festuca nitida ssp. flaccida, Poaceae
Festuca rupicola ssp. pachyphylla, Poaceae
Festuca versicolor, Poaceae
Forsythia europaea, Oleaceae
Fritillaria drenovskii, LiliaceaeFritillaria pontica, LiliaceaeFumaria jankae, Papaveraceae

GGalatella albanica, AsteraceaeGalium capitatum, RubiaceaeGalium demissum ssp. stojanovii, RubiaceaeGalium rhodopeum, Rubiaceae Galium valantioides var. baillonii, RubiaceaeGenista lydia ssp. rumelica, FabaceaeGentiana albanica, GentianaceaeGentiana dinarica, GentianaceaeGentiana laevicalyx, GentianaceaeGentiana pontica, GentianaceaeGentianella bulgarica, GentianaceaeGeum bulgaricum, RosaceaeGeum rhodopeum, RosaceaeGlobularia cordifolia, PlantaginaceaeGoniolimon besseranum, Plumbaginaceae

HHaberlea rhodopensis, Gesneriaceae
Halacsya sendtneri, BoraginaceaeHalacsya sendtneri, BoraginaceaeHaplophyllum balcanicum, RutaceaeHeliosperma retzdorffianum, Caryophyllaceae
Heptaptera macedonica, Apiaceae
Herniaria olympica, Caryophyllaceae
Hesperis dinarica, Brassicaceae
Hesperis matronalis ssp. nivea, BrassicaceaeHesperis matronalis ssp. schurii, Brassicaceae
Hieracium praebiharicum, Asteraceae
Hippocrepis comosa, FabaceaeHypericum cerastoides, HypericaceaeHypericum rhodopeum, Hypericaceae

IIberis sempervirens, BrassicaceaeInula macedonicus, AsteraceaeInula verbascifolia ssp. aschersoniana, AsteraceaeIris bosniaca, IridaceaeIris suaveolens, IridaceaeIxoca macrantha, Caryophyllaceae

JJasione montana f. heldreichii, Campanulaceae
Jasionella bulgarica, Campanulaceae
Johrenia distans, Apiaceae
Juncellus pannonicus, Cyperaceae
Juniperus sabina, Cupressaceae
Jurinea tzar-ferdinandii, Asteraceae

KKitaibela vitifolia, Malvaceae
Knautia albanica, Caprifoliaceae
Knautia macedonica, Caprifoliaceae
Knautia sarajevoensis, Caprifoliaceae
Koeleria subaristata, Poaceae

LLathraea rhodopaea, Orobanchaceae
Lathyrus binatus, Fabaceae
Lathyrus panicicii, Fabaceae
Leucanthemum chloratum, Asteraceae Lilium bosniacum, LiliaceaeLilium cattaniae, LiliaceaeLilium pyrenaicum var. albanicum, LiliaceaeLilium pyrenaicum var. jankae, LiliaceaeLilium rhodopeum, LiliaceaeLimonium asterotrichum, Plumbaginaceae
Linum dolomiticum, Linaceae
Linum elegans, Linaceae
Linum rhodopeum, Linaceae
Linum thracicum, Linaceae
Linum uninerve, Linaceae

M
Malcolmia orsiniana ssp. orsiniana, BrassicaceaeMarrubium friwaldskyanum, Lamiaceae
Marrubium velutinum, LamiaceaeMelampyrum dorflerii, Scrophulariaceae
Melampyrum trichocalycinum, ScrophulariaceaeMerendera rhodopea, ColchicaceaeMinuartia bosniaca, Caryophyllaceae
Minuartia cataractarum, CaryophyllaceaeMinuartia halacsyi, Caryophyllaceae
Minuartia handelii, CaryophyllaceaeMinuartia hirsuta, CaryophyllaceaeMinuartia velutina, CaryophyllaceaeMoltkia doerfleri, Boraginaceae

NNarthecium scardicum, NartheciaceaeNavicularia scardica, Lamiaceae
Noccaea bellidifolia, BrassicaceaeNoccaea kovatsii, BrassicaceaeNoccaea praecox, Brassicaceae

OOnobrychis montana, FabaceaeOnosma rhodopea, BoraginaceaeOnosma thracica,  BoraginaceaeOnosma visianii, Boraginaceae
Origanum striatum, Lamiaceae
Ornithogalum orthophyllum ssp. acuminatum, AsparagaceaeOrnithogalum umbellatum ssp. orthophyllum, AsparagaceaeOxyropis prenja, Fabaceae
Oxytropis jacquinii, FabaceaeOxytropis prenja, Fabaceae

P
Papaver corona-sancti-stephani, PapaveraceaeParonychia kapela, Caryophyllaceae
Pedicularis brachyodonta, Orobanchaceae
Pedicularis hoermanniana, ScrophulariaceaePedicularis orthantha, Orobanchaceae
Peridictyon sanctum, Poaceae
Petteria ramentacea, Fabaceae
Picea omorika, PinaceaePimpinella serbicum, ApiaceaePinguicula balcanica, LentibulariaceaePinguicula hirtiflora, LentibulariaceaePinus heldreichii, PinaceaePinus nigra ssp. dalmatica, PinaceaePlantago atrata, PlantaginaceaePoa dolosa, PoaceaePoa granitica ssp. disparilis, Poaceae
Polygala carniolica, PolygalaceaePolygala rhodoptera, PolygalaceaePolygala supina, PolygalaceaePotentilla chrysantha, RosaceaePotentilla deorum, RosaceaePotentilla fruticosa, RosaceaePrimula auricula ssp. serratifolia, Primulaceae
Primula deorum, PrimulaceaePrimula frondosa, PrimulaceaePrimula kitaibeliana, Primulaceae
Primula kitaibeliana, Primulaceae
Primula wulfeniana, Primulaceae
Puccinellia limosa, Poaceae
Pulsatilla slavjankae, Ranunculaceae

R
Ramonda heldreichii, syn. Jankaea heldreichii, Gesneriaceae
Ramonda nathaliae, Gesneriaceae
Ramonda serbica,  Gesneriaceae
Ranunculus hayekii, Ranunculaceae
Ranunculus illyricus, RanunculaceaeRanunculus montenegrinus, RanunculaceaeRanunculus pedatus, RanunculaceaeRanunculus sartorianus, Ranunculaceae
Ranunculus serbicus, Ranunculaceae
Rheum rhaponticum, Polygonaceae
Rorippa lippizensis, Brassicaceae
Rosa balcarica, Rosaceae
Rosa parilica, Rosaceae
Rumex balcanicus', Polygonaceae

SSalvia brachiodon, LamiaceaeSalvia eichleriana, LamiaceaeSalvia pratense var. varbossania, LamiaceaeSaponaria sicula ssp. stranjensis, CaryophyllaceaeSatureja horvatii, LamiaceaeSatureja rumelica, LamiaceaeSaxifraga ferdinandi-coburgi, SaxifragaceaeSaxifraga mutata ssp. demissa, Saxifragaceae
Saxifraga prenja, Saxifragaceae
Saxifraga stribrnyi, Saxifragaceae
Scabiosa rhodopensis, Caprifoliaceae
Scilla litardierei, Asparagaceae
Sclarea transsylvanica, Lamiaceae
Scorodonia arduinii, Lamiaceae
Scrophularia aestivalis, Scrophulariaceae
Scrophularia bosniaca, Scrophulariaceae
Scrophularia tristis, Scrophulariaceae
Secale strictum, Poaceae
Sedum kostovii, Crassulaceae
Sedum stefco, Crassulaceae
Sedum zollikoferi, Crassulaceae
Senecio bosniacus, Asteraceae
Senecio macedonicus, Asteraceae
Senecio pancicii, Asteraceae
Seseli leucospermum, Apiaceae
Sibiraea laevigata, Rosaceae
Sibirea croatica, Rosaceae
Silene altaica, Caryophyllaceae
Silene balcanica, Caryophyllaceae
Silene degeneri, Caryophyllaceae
Silene dinarica, Caryophyllaceae
Silene flavescens, Caryophyllaceae
Silene gigantea, Caryophyllaceae
Silene hayekiana, Caryophyllaceae
Silene nivalis, Caryophyllaceae
Silene pindicola, Caryophyllaceae
Silene reichenbachii, Caryophyllaceae
Silene retzdorffiana, CaryophyllaceaeSilene trojanensis, Caryophyllaceae
Silene vallesia ssp. graminea, Caryophyllaceae
Siphonostegia syriaca, Orobanchaceae
Soldanella hungarica, Primulaceae
Soldanella pindicola, Primulaceae
Solenanthus stamineus, BoraginaceaeSorbus bordasii, RosaceaeSorbus graeca, RosaceaeStachys iva, LamiaceaeStachys spinulosa ssp. milanii, LamiaceaeStrobus peuce, PinaceaeSuccisella petteri, DipsacaceaeSymphiandra hofmannii, Campanulaceae

TThelapsi dacicum ssp. banaticum, OrchidaceaeThesium kernerianum, SantalaceaeThymus bihoriensis, LamiaceaeThymus stojanovii, LamiaceaeTithymalus barrelieri ssp. hercegovinus, EuphorbiaceaeTithymalus gregersenii, Euphorbiaceae
Tithymalus montenegrinus, Euphorbiaceae
Tithymalus velenovskyi, EuphorbiaceaeTragopogon balcanicus, Asteraceae
Trifolium durmitoreum, Fabaceae
Trifolium velenowskyi, FabaceaeTrifolium wettsteinii, FabaceaeTrisetum altaicum, PoaceaeTulipa hungarica var. urumoffii, Liliaceae
Tulipa pavlovii, Liliaceae
Tulipa rhodopea, Liliaceae

V
Verbascum balcanicum, Scrophulariaceae
Verbascum bosnense, Scrophulariaceae
Verbascum davidovii, Scrophulariaceae
Verbascum durmitoreum, Scrophulariaceae
Verbascum humile ssp. rhodopaeum, ScrophulariaceaeVerbascum pelium, ScrophulariaceaeVeronica rhodopaea, PlantaginaceaeVeronica saturejoides, PlantaginaceaeVeronica saturejoides, PlantaginaceaeVeronica serpyllifolia ssp. humifusa, PlantaginaceaeVicia montenegrina, FabaceaeVicia ochroleuca ssp. dinara, FabaceaeViola calcarata, ViolaceaeViola dacica, Violaceae
Viola delphinantha, Violaceae
Viola grisebachiana, Violaceae
Viola jooi, Violaceae
Viola orphanidis, ViolaceaeViola perinensis, ViolaceaeViola rhodopeia, ViolaceaeViola tricolor ssp. macedonica, ViolaceaeViola vilaensis, Violaceae

W
Wahlenbergia graminifolia, Campanulaceae
Wahlenbergia serbica, Campanulaceae
Wulfenia baldaccii, Plantaginaceae
Wulfenia blecicii, Plantaginaceae
Wulfenia rohlenae, Plantaginaceae

Y
Youngia altaica, Asteraceae

References

Flora of Europe by region
Biogeography
Environment of the Balkans
Biota of the Balkans